Satish Motling is an Indian film director born on  29 October 1982 who has directed Marathi films such as Agadbam and Matter. His movie Priyatama was released on 14 February 2014. Next upcoming release is 35% kathawar pass & Mile jab chora chori. He is also known for international adfilms.

Filmography

References

External links
 
 

Living people
Marathi film directors
1982 births